Ashley Torres (born 15 September 1985) is a Belizean professional footballer who currently plays for Placencia Assassins and the Belize national football team as a striker.

External links

1985 births
Living people
Belize international footballers
Belizean footballers
Premier League of Belize players
2013 Copa Centroamericana players
2013 CONCACAF Gold Cup players
Georgetown Ibayani FC players

Association football forwards
Altitude FC (Belize) players
Freedom Fighters FC players